The Muscogee language (Muskogee, Mvskoke  in Muscogee), also known as Creek, is a Muskogean language spoken by Muscogee (Creek) and Seminole people, primarily in the US states of Oklahoma and Florida. Along with Mikasuki, when it is spoken by the Seminole, it is known as Seminole.

Historically, the language was spoken by various constituent groups of the Muscogee or Maskoki in what are now Alabama and Georgia. It is related to but not mutually intelligible with the other primary language of the Muscogee confederacy, Hitchiti-Mikasuki, which is spoken by the kindred Mikasuki, as well as with other Muskogean languages.

The Muscogee first brought the Muscogee and Miccosukee languages to Florida in the early 18th century. Combining with other ethnicities there, they emerged as the Seminole. During the 1830s, however, the US government forced most Muscogee and Seminole to relocate west of the Mississippi River, with most forced into Indian Territory.

The language is today spoken by around 5,000 people, most of whom live in Oklahoma and are members of the Muscogee Nation and the Seminole Nation of Oklahoma. Around 200 speakers are Florida Seminole. Seminole-speakers have developed distinct dialects.

Current status
Creek is widely spoken among the Creek. The Muscogee Nation offers free language classes and immersion camps to Creek children.

Language programs

The College of the Muscogee Nation offers a language certificate program. Tulsa public schools, the University of Oklahoma and Glenpool Library in Tulsa and the Holdenville, Okmulgee, and Tulsa Creek Indian Communities of the Muscogee (Creek) Nation offer Muskogee Creek language classes. In 2013, the Sapulpa Creek Community Center graduated a class of 14 from its Muscogee language class.  In 2018, 8 teachers graduated from a class put on by the Seminole nation at Seminole State College to try and reintroduce the Muskogee language to students in elementary and high school in several schools around the state.

Phonology
The phoneme inventory of Muscogee consists of thirteen consonants and three vowel qualities, which distinguish length, tone and nasalization. It also makes use of the gemination of stops, fricatives and sonorants.

Consonants
These are the consonant phonemes of Muscogee:

Plosives
There are four voiceless stops in Creek: .  is a voiceless palatal affricate and patterns as a single consonant and so with the other voiceless stops.  has an alveolar allophone  before .

Between instances of [], or after  at the end of a syllable, the velar  is realized as the uvular [] or []. For example:
{|
|in-coko
|
|'his or her house'
|
|
|-
|tokná:wa
|
|'money'
|
|
|}

Fricatives
There are four voiceless fricatives in Muscogee Creek: .  can be realized as either labiodental or bilabial  in place of articulation.

{|
|oh-leyk-itá
|
|'chair'
|
|
|-
|ohɬolopi:
|
|'year'
|
|
|}

Sonorants
The sonorants in Muscogee are two nasals ( and ), two semivowels ( and ), and the lateral , all voiced. Nasal assimilation occurs in Creek:  becomes [] before .

{|
|camhcá:ka
|
|'bell'
|
|
|-
|akcáwhko
|
|'a type of water bird'
|
|
|}

Geminates
All plosives and fricatives in Muscogee can be geminated (lengthened). For the majority of speakers, except for those influenced by the Alabama or Koasati languages, the geminate  does not occur.

Vowels
The vowel phonemes of Muscogee are as follows:

There are three short vowels  and three long vowels . There are also the nasal vowels  (in the linguistic orthography, they are often written with an ogonek under them or a following superscript "n"). Most occurrences of nasal vowels are the result of nasal assimilation or the nasalizing grade, but there are some forms that show contrast between oral and nasal vowels:
{|
|pó-ɬki
|
|'our father'
|-
|opónɬko
|
|'cutworm'
|}

Short vowels
The three short vowels  can be realized as the lax and centralized when a neighboring consonant is coronal or in closed syllables. Initial vowels can be deleted in Creek, mostly applying to the vowel . The deletion will affect the pitch of the following syllable by creating a higher-than-expected pitch on the new initial syllable. Furthermore, initial vowel deletion in the case of single-morpheme, short words such as ifa 'dog' or icó 'deer' is impossible, as the shortest a Creek word can be is a one-syllable word ending in a long vowel (fóː 'bee') or a two-syllable word ending with a short vowel (ací 'corn').

Long vowels
There are three long vowels in Muscogee Creek, which are slightly longer than short vowels and are never centralized.

Long vowels are rarely followed by a sonorant in the same syllable. Therefore, when syllables are created (often from suffixation or contractions) in which a long vowel is followed by a sonorant, the vowel is shortened:
{|
|in-ɬa:m-itá
|
|'to uncover, open'
|-
|in-ɬam-k-itá
|
|'to be uncovered, open'
|}

Diphthongs

Nasal vowels
Both long and short vowels can be nasalized (the distinction between acces and ącces below), but long nasal vowels are more common. Nasal vowels usually appear as a result of a contraction, as the result of a neighboring nasal consonant, or as the result of nasalizing grade, a grammatical ablaut, which indicates intensification through lengthening and nasalization of a vowel ( 'warm' with the nasalizing grade intensifies the word to likŏ:nth-os-i: 'nice and warm'). Nasal vowels may also appear as part of a suffix that indicates a question (o:sk-ihá:n 'I wonder if it's raining').

Tones
There are three phonemic tones in Muscogee; they are generally unmarked except in the linguistic orthography: high (marked in the linguistic orthography with an acute accent: á, etc.), low (unmarked: a, etc.), and falling (marked with a circumflex: â, etc.).

Orthography
The traditional Muscogee alphabet was adopted by the tribe in the late 1800s and has 20 letters.

Although it is based on the Latin alphabet, some sounds are vastly different from those in English like those represented by c, e, i, r, and v.  Here are the (approximately) equivalent sounds using familiar English words and the IPA:

There are also three vowel sequences whose spellings match their phonetic makeup:

Consonants
As mentioned above, certain consonants in Muscogee, when they appear between two sonorants (a vowel or m, n, l, w, or y), become voiced. They are the consonants represented by p, t, k, c, and s:

 c can sound like , the "j" in just
 k can sound like , the "g" in goat
 p can sound like , the "b" in boat
 s can sound like , the "z" in zoo
 t can sound like , the "d" in dust

In addition, certain combinations of consonants sound differently from English, giving multiple possible transcriptions. The most prominent case is the second person singular ending for verbs. Wiketv means "to stop:" the verb for "you are stopping" may be written in Creek as wikeckes or wiketskes. Both are pronounced the same. The -eck- transliteration is preferred by Innes (2004), and the -etsk- transliteration has been used by Martin (2000) and Loughridge (1964).

Vowel length
While vowel length in Muscogee is distinctive, it is somewhat inconsistently indicated in the traditional orthography. The following basic correspondences can be noted:

 The short vowel v with the long vowel a ( vs. )
 The short vowel e with the long vowel ē ( vs. )
 The short vowel u with the long vowel o ( vs. )

However, the correspondences do not always apply, and in some words, short  is spelled a, long  is spelled e, and short  is spelled o.

Nonstandard orthography
Muscogee Creek words carry distinctive tones and nasalization of their vowels. These features are not marked in the traditional orthography, only in dictionaries and linguistic publications. The following additional markers have been used by Martin (2000) and Innes (2004):

 Falling tone in a syllable is shown using a circumflex. In English, falling tone is found in phrases such as "uh-oh" or commands such as "stop!" In Muscogee, however, changing a verb such as acces ("she is putting on (a dress)") to âcces alters the meaning from one of process to one of state ("she is wearing (a dress)").
 Nasalization of a vowel is shown with an ogonek under the vowel. Changing the verb acces to ącces adds the imperfective aspect, a sense of repeated or habitual action ("she kept putting on (that same dress)").
 The key syllable of a word is often shown with an accent and is the last syllable that has normal (high) tone within a word; the following syllables are all lower in pitch.

Grammar

Word order 
The general sentence structure fits the pattern subject–object–verb. The subject or object may be a noun or a noun followed by one or more adjectives. Adverbs tend to occur either at the beginning of the sentence (for time adverbs) or immediately before the verb (for manner adverbs).

Grammatical case 
Case is marked on noun phrases using the clitics -t for subjects, and -n for non-subjects. The clitic -n can appear on multiple noun phrases in a single sentence at once, such as the direct object, indirect object, and adverbial nouns. Despite the distinction in verbal affixes between the agent and patient of the verb, the clitic -t marks subject of both transitive and intransitive verbs.

In some situations, case marking is omitted. This is especially true of sentences with only one noun where the role of the noun is obvious from the personal marking on the verb. Case marking is also omitted on fixed phrases that use a noun, e.g. "go to town" or "build a fire".

Verbs
In Muscogee, a single verb can translate into an entire English sentence. The root infinitive form of the verb is altered for:

 Person of agent. Letketv = to run.
 Lētkis. = I am running.
 Lētketskes. = You are running.
 Lētkes. = He / She is running.
 Plural forms can be a bit more complicated (see below).
 Person of patient and/or indirect object. That is accomplished with prefixes. Hecetv = to see.
 Cehēcis = I see you.
 Cvhēcetskes. = You see me.
 Hvtvm Cehēcares. = I will see you again.
 Tense. Pohetv = to hear.
 Pohis. = I am hearing (present).
 Pohhis. = I just heard (first or immediate past; within a day ago).
 Pohvhanis. = I am going to hear.
 Pohares. = I will hear.
 Pohiyvnks. = I heard recently (second or middle past, within a week ago).
 Pohimvts. = I heard (third or distant past, within a year ago).
 Pohicatēs. = Long ago I heard (fourth or remote past, beyond a year ago).
 There are at least ten more tenses, including perfect versions of the above, as well as future, indefinite, and pluperfect.
 Mood. Wiketv = to stop.
 Wikes. = He / She is stopping (indicative).
 Wikvs. = Stop! (imperative)
 Wike wites. = He / She may stop (potential).
 Wiken omat. = If he / she stops (subjunctive).
 Wikepices. = He / She made someone stop (causative).
 Aspect. Kerretv = to learn.
 Kērris. = I am learning (progressive, ongoing or in progress).
 Kêrris. = I know (resulting state).
 Kęrris. = I keep learning (imperfect, habitual or repeated action).
 Kerîyis. = I just learned (action completed in the past).
 Voice.
 Wihkis. = I just stopped (active voice, 1st past).
 Cvwihokes. = I was just stopped (passive voice, 1st past).
 Negatives.
 Wikarēs. = I will stop (positive, future tense).
 Wikakarēs. = I will not stop (negative, future tense).
 Questions.  Hompetv = to eat; nake = what.
 Hompetskes. = You are eating.
 Hompetskv? = Are you eating? (expecting a yes or no answer)
 Naken hompetska? = What are you eating? (expecting a long answer)

Verbs with irregular plurals
Some Muscogee verbs, especially those involving motion, have highly irregular plurals: letketv = to run, with a singular subject, but tokorketv = to run of two subjects and pefatketv = to run of three or more.

Stative verbs
Another entire class of Muscogee verbs is the stative verbs, which express no action, imply no duration, and provide only description of a static condition. In some languages, such as English, they are expressed as adjectives. In Muscogee, the verbs behave like adjectives but are classed and treated as verbs. However, they are not altered for the person of the subject by an affix, as above; instead, the prefix changes:

enokkē = to be sick;
enokkēs = he / she is sick;
cvnokkēs = I'm sick;
cenokkēs = you are sick.

Locative prefixes
Prefixes are also used in Muscogee for shades of meaning of verbs that are expressed, in English, by adverbs in phrasal verbs. For example, in English, the verb to go can be changed to to go up, to go in, to go around, and other variations. In Muscogee, the same principle of shading a verb's meaning is handled by locative prefixes:

Example:  vyetv = to go (singular subjects only, see above);
ayes = I am going;
ak-ayes = I am going (in water / in a low place / under something);
tak-ayes = I am going (on the ground);
oh-ayes = I am going (on top of something).

However, for verbs of motion, Muscogee has a large selection of verbs with a specific meaning:  = to go out;  = to go through.

Switch-reference 
Clauses in a sentence use switch-reference clitics to co-ordinate their subjects. The clitic -t on a verb in a clause marks that the verb's subject is the same as that of the next clause. The clitic -n marks that verb's subject is different from the next clause.

Possession

In some languages, a special form of the noun, the genitive case, is used to show possession.  In Muscogee this relationship is expressed in two quite different ways, depending on the nature of the noun.

Nouns in fixed relationships (inalienable possession)

A body part or family member cannot be named in Muscogee without mentioning the possessor, which is an integrated part of the word. A set of changeable prefixes serves this function:

  = his / her hand
  = my hand
  = your hand
  = our hand

Even if the possessor is mentioned specifically, the prefix still must be part of the word: Toskē enke = Toske's hand. It is not redundant in Muscogee ("Toske his_hand").

Transferable nouns
All other nouns are possessed through a separate set of pronouns.

 efv = dog;
 vm efv = my dog;
 cem efv = your dog;
 em efv = his / her dog;
 pum efv = our dog.

Again, even though the construction in English would be redundant, the proper way to form the possessive in Muscogee must include the correct preposition: Toskē em efv = Toske's dog. That is grammatically correct in Muscogee, unlike the literal English translation "Toske his dog".

Locative nouns
A final distinctive feature, related to the above, is the existence of locational nouns. In English, speakers have prepositions to indicate location, for example, behind, around, beside, and so on.  In Muscogee, the locations are actually nouns. These are possessed just like parts of the body and family members were above.

  = house;  = noun for "behind";  = behind the house;  = behind me;  = behind you.
  = under;  = tree;  = under the tree.
  = near;  = near me;  = near you;  = near us.

Examples

 Family.
 Erke. = Father.
 Ecke. = Mother. 
 Pauwv. = Maternal Uncle. 
 Erkuce. = Paternal Uncle.
 Eckuce. = Aunt. 
 Puca. = Grandpa. 
 Puse. = Grandma.
 Cēpvnē. = Boy. 
 Hoktuce. = Girl.

Male vs. female speech
Claudio Saunt, writing about the language of the later 18th century, said that there were different feminine and masculine versions, which he also calls dialects, of the Muscogee language. Males "attach[ed] distinct endings to verbs", while Females "accent[ed] different syllables". These forms, mentioned in the first (1860) grammar of the Creek language, persisted in the Hichiti, Muscogee proper, and Koasati languages at least into the first half of the 20th century.

Seminole dialects
The forms of Muscogee used by the Seminoles of Oklahoma and Florida are separate dialects from the ones spoken by Muscogee people. Oklahoma Seminole speak a dialect known as Oklahoma Seminole Creek. Florida Seminole Creek is one of two languages spoken among Florida Seminoles; it is less common than the Mikasuki language. The most distinct dialect of the language is said to be that of the Florida Seminole, which is described as "rapid", "staccato" and "dental", with more loan words from Spanish and Mikasuki as opposed to English. Florida Seminole is the most endangered register of Muskogee.

See also
 Muscogee people
 Creek mythology
 Muskogean languages
 Mikasuki language

References

Citations

Bibliography

Brown, Keith, and Sarah Ogilvie (2008). Concise encyclopedia of languages of the world, pp. 738–740. Elsevier. Retrieved September 27, 2011.
Haas, Mary R. and James H. Hill. 2014. Creek (Muskogee) Texts. Edited and translated by Jack B. Martin, Margaret McKane Mauldin, and Juanita McGirt. UC Publications in Linguistics. Berkeley: University of California Press.

External links

 The Creek Language Archive.  This site includes a draft of a Creek textbook, which may be downloaded in .pdf format (Pum Opunvkv, Pun Yvhiketv, Pun Fulletv:  Our Language, Our Songs, Our Ways by Margaret Mauldin, Jack Martin, and Gloria McCarty).
 The official website for the Muskogee (Creek) Nation of Oklahoma
 Acoustic vowel reduction in Creek: Effects of distinctive length and position in the word (pdf)
 Mvskoke Nakcokv Eskerretv Esvhokkolat. Creek Second Reader. (1871)
 Muskogee Genesis Translation
 OLAC resources in and about the Creek language

Agglutinative languages
Muskogean languages
Indigenous languages of Oklahoma
Indigenous languages of the North American Southeast
Muscogee culture
Seminole culture